Union Village is a town in Saint Andrew Parish, Grenada.  It is located on the island's eastern coast.

References

Populated places in Grenada
Saint Andrew Parish, Grenada